Apollo 18: Mission to the Moon is a 1987 video game published by Accolade and developed by Canadian studio Artech.

Gameplay
Apollo 18: Mission to the Moon is a game in which the Apollo mission is re-created from countdown to splashdown.

Reception
David M. Wilson reviewed the game for Computer Gaming World, and stated that "One thing is for sure, gamers who spend their money on this game will not spend their time in the light of the silvery moon or moonlighting, they will be at their computers."

Reviews
ASM (Aktueller Software Markt) - Dec, 1987
Zzap! - Mar, 1988
The Games Machine - Jan, 1989
The Games Machine - Mar, 1988
ACE (Advanced Computer Entertainment) - Mar, 1988

References

External links
Review in PC World
Review in Compute!'s Gazette
Review in Info
Review in Power Play (German)
Review in Commodore Computing International
Review in RUN Magazine
Review in Commodore Magazine
Review in COMputer (Swedish)
Review in The Australian Commodore and Amiga Review
Review in Commodore User
Review in Pelit (Finnish)
Review in RUN Magazine
Review in Computer Play

1987 video games
Accolade (company) games
Artech Studios games
Commodore 64 games
DOS games
Space flight simulator games
Video games developed in Canada
Video games set in the 1980s
Video games set on the Moon
Works about the Apollo program